The Present is a 2014 animated short film directed and co-written by Jacob Frey and co-written with Markus Kranzler. It is based on "Perfeição", a comic strip by Fabio Coala. The short film tells the story of a 12 year old  boy who gets a three-legged puppy from his mom, eventually warming up to him. The short explores the challenging topic of disability and living with an amputated leg.

The film has won 81 awards from several film festivals and has garnered acclaim from critics and audiences alike. Both Kranzler and Frey would go on to get hired at Pixar and Walt Disney Animation Studios respectively, particularly because of the attention The Present had received.

Plot
A 12-year-old boy plays a shooter video game in a darkened living room behind blinds, but is surprised when his mother arrives with a box, saying it contains a present for him.  She then goes upstairs to answer a phone call.  The boy opens the box, revealing an energetic young puppy. The boy's delight turns to disgust however, as he sees the puppy is missing most of his left front leg. He tosses the puppy away and continues playing his game. Unperturbed, the puppy finds a red rubber ball under a cabinet and walks up to the boy, carrying the rubber ball and inviting him to play. The boy does his best to ignore the puppy but is soon won over by his determination and spirit, in spite of himself. The boy shuts off the video game and decides to go outside to play fetch with his dog, where it is revealed that he walks with crutches, as his left leg has been amputated below the knee.

Reception and legacy 
The short film was screened at 293 different film festivals and has won 81 accolades from all film festivals and has received critical acclaim.

As a result, both Frey and Kranzler moved to the United States in October and have been hired at Walt Disney Animation Studios and Pixar respectively. Frey has worked on Disney films such as Zootopia and Moana, while Kranzler has worked on Pixar films such as Finding Dory, Cars 3 and Coco.

References

External links

Official website
https://www.imdb.com/name/nm3936469/
https://www.imdb.com/name/nm4181513/

2014 short films
2014 films
2014 computer-animated films
2010s animated short films
German animated short films
Films about disability
Films about amputees
Animated films about dogs
2010s German films